At the 2001 Mediterranean Games, the athletics events were held in Tunis and Radès in Tunisia from 11 to 14 September 2001. Italy topped the medal table with 9 gold medals and 30 medals in total, shortly followed by France which also had 9 golds but 23 medals overall. Greece had the next greatest medal haul and the hosts Tunisia won 9 medals, two of which were gold. A total of 10 new Games records were set during the competition.

A total of 46 events were contested, of which 23 by male and 23 by female athletes. This was the first time that the male and female event programmes had reached parity as a number of new events were introduced for women, including: 3000 metres steeplechase, pole vault and hammer throw. Two women's events were modified: the javelin model was changed and the 10 km racewalk was extended to a 20 kilometres racewalk. This was also the final time that marathon races were held at the Mediterranean Games as they were replaced by the half marathon from 2005 onwards.

Records

 † = New event or model

Medal summary

Men

Women

Medal table

Participation

 (2)
 (21)
 (3)
 (2)
 (16)
 (25)
 (8)
 (54)
 (63)
 (63)
 (3)
 (5)
 (6)
 (7)
 (21)
 (1)
 (3)
 (13)
 (54)
 (5)
 (39)
 (16)
 (8)

References

Results
Mediterranean Games – Past Medallists. GBR Athletics. Retrieved on 2010-04-01.
Day 1 results (archived)
Day 2 results (archived)
Day 3 results (archived)
Day 4 results (archived)

M
Ath
2001
Sports competitions in Radès
21st century in Radès